Fugitive of the Plains is a 1943 American Producers Releasing Corporation Western film of the "Billy the Kid" series directed by Sam Newfield.  In April 1947 PRC re-released the film as a "streamlined" (edited) "Bronco Buckaroo" version re titled Raiders of Red Rock.

Plot summary
Billy and his sidekick Fuzzy get word that crimes are being conducted in his name in nearby Red Rock County. Investigating the situation in the hopes of clearing his name, he discovers a gang headed by pretty Kate Shelly. Though they know who he is, he pretends to join the gang to smash it from the inside.

Cast
Buster Crabbe as Billy the Kid
Al St. John as Fuzzy Jones
Maxine Leslie as Kate Shelly
Jack Ingram as Henchman Dillon
Kermit Maynard as Henchman Spence
Karl Hackett as Red Rock Sheriff Sam Packard
Hal Price as Willow Springs Sheriff Dave Connelly
George Chesebro as Henchman Baxter
Frank Ellis as Henchman Dirk
John Merton as Deputy arresting Fuzzy

Soundtrack

See also
The "Billy the Kid" films starring Buster Crabbe: 
 Billy the Kid Wanted (1941)
 Billy the Kid's Round-Up (1941)
 Billy the Kid Trapped (1942)
 Billy the Kid's Smoking Guns (1942)
 Law and Order (1942) 
 Sheriff of Sage Valley (1942) 
 The Mysterious Rider (1942)
 The Kid Rides Again (1943)
 Fugitive of the Plains (1943)
 Western Cyclone (1943)
 Cattle Stampede (1943)
 The Renegade (1943)
 Blazing Frontier (1943)
 Devil Riders (1943)
 Frontier Outlaws (1944)
 Valley of Vengeance (1944)
 The Drifter (1944) 
 Fuzzy Settles Down (1944)
 Rustlers' Hideout (1944)
 Wild Horse Phantom (1944)
 Oath of Vengeance (1944)
 His Brother's Ghost (1945) 
 Thundering Gunslingers (1945)
 Shadows of Death (1945)
 Gangster's Den (1945)
 Stagecoach Outlaws (1945)
 Border Badmen (1945)
 Fighting Bill Carson (1945)
 Prairie Rustlers (1945) 
 Lightning Raiders (1945)
 Terrors on Horseback (1946)
 Gentlemen with Guns (1946)
 Ghost of Hidden Valley (1946)
 Prairie Badmen (1946)
 Overland Riders (1946)
 Outlaws of the Plains (1946)

External links

1943 films
1943 Western (genre) films
1940s action adventure films
American black-and-white films
Billy the Kid (film series)
Producers Releasing Corporation films
American Western (genre) films
1940s English-language films
Films directed by Sam Newfield
1940s American films